Nodosaurus (meaning "knobbed lizard") is a genus of herbivorous nodosaurid ankylosaurian dinosaur from the Late Cretaceous, the fossils of which are found exclusively in the Frontier Formation in Wyoming.

Description

 
The dermal plates were arranged in bands along its body, with narrow bands over the ribs alternating with wider plates in between. These wider plates were covered in regularly arranged bony nodules, which give the animal its scientific name. In 2010 Paul estimated its length at 6 meters (20 ft) and its weight at 3.5 tonnes (3.85 short tons).

It had four short legs, five-toed feet, a short neck, and a long, stiff, clubless tail. The head was narrow, with a pointed snout, powerful jaws, and small teeth. It perhaps ate soft plants, as it would have been unable to chew tough, fibrous ones; or alternatively it may have processed the latter with gastroliths and its enormous intestinal apparatus.

History and classification
 
During the Bone Wars between palaeontologists Othniel Charles Marsh and Edward Drinker Cope, Marsh sent his collector William Harlow Reed to the Cenomanian strata of the Frontier Formation of Albany County, Wyoming to collect fossil mammals and reptiles. Reed collected a partial postcranial skeleton (YPM VP 1815) on July 17, 1881 southeast of the productive Quarry 13, the skeleton including: 3 dorsal and 13 caudal vertebrae, 3 dorsal ribs, fragmentary forelimbs, a partial pelvis, femora, tibiae, partial left pes, and several osteoderms. One of the first armored dinosaurs to be discovered in North America, Nodosaurus textilis was named by Othniel Charles Marsh in 1889, the generic name meaning "knobbed lizard" and the specific name meaning "woven". Marsh assigned to genus to Stegosauria, but later assigned it to its own family, Nodosauridae, in 1890 based on the heavy dermal armor, solid bones, large forelimbs, and ungulate feet. The type specimen remains the only definite specimen of Nodosaurus, though Stegopelta has been considered a synonym in the past, it is most likely a distinct Struthiosaurinine. Richard Swan Lull did a more comprehensive description of Nodosaurus in 1921, who assigned the taxa Stegopelta, Hoplitosaurus, Hierosaurus, Ankylosaurus, and placed the British Polacanthus as a relative of the family.

Nodosaurus was confirmed to belong within Nodosaurinae in 2018 and was placed as the sister taxon to Acantholipan. The 2018 phylogenetic analysis of Rivera-Sylva and colleagues is below.

See also

 Timeline of ankylosaur research

References

Nodosaurids
Late Cretaceous dinosaurs of North America
Fossil taxa described in 1889
Taxa named by Othniel Charles Marsh
Paleontology in Wyoming
Ornithischian genera